The Political Achievements of the Earl of Dalkeith was a political pamphlet that was published and circulated in Edinburgh during the 1880 United Kingdom general election.  It was well presented but inside the neatly printed cover there were just thirty-two blank pages, making it an early empty book.

The publication was thought to be an effective attack on William Montagu Douglas Scott, 6th Duke of Buccleuch. He was the MP for the Midlothian constituency, and lost the seat to Gladstone by 211 votes.

References

Pamphlets
1880 documents
Empty books